This page lists the World Best Year Performance in the year 1987 in both the men's and the women's race walking distances: 10 km, 20 km and 50 km (outdoor). One of the main events during this season were the 1987 World Athletics Championships in Rome, Italy.

Abbreviations
All times shown are in hours:minutes:seconds

Men's 20 km

Records

1987 World Year Ranking

Men's 50 km

Records

1987 World Year Ranking

Women's 5 km

Records

1987 World Year Ranking

Women's 10 km

Records

1987 World Year Ranking

See also
1987 IAAF World Race Walking Cup

References
maik-richter
alltime-athletics

1987
Race Walking Year Ranking, 1987